The 22nd running of the women's Flèche wallonne was held on 24 April 2019. The race started and finished in Huy. The route featured seven categorized climbs, including two ascents of the Mur de Huy. The finish line was on the top of the final ascent of the Mur. It was won for the fifth consecutive time by Anna van der Breggen.

Route
The race started and finished in Huy, following the same route as the 2018 race. The final 30 km loop was covered twice, totalling 118.5 km. 

There were 7 categorised climbs:
45.5 km: Côte de Warre - 2.2 km climb at 4.9%
73 km: Côte d'Ereffe - 2.1 km climb at 5%
83.5 km: Côte de Cherave - 1.3 km climb at 8.1%
89.5 km: Mur de Huy - 1.3 km climb at 9.6%
102 km: Côte d'Ereffe - 2.1 km climb at 5%
112.5 km: Côte de Cherave - 1.3 km climb at 8.1%
118.5 km: Mur de Huy - 1.3 km climb at 9.6%

Teams
Twenty-four teams participated in the race. Each team had a maximum of six riders:

Result

See also
 2019 in women's road cycling

References

La Fleche Wallonne Feminine
La Flèche Wallonne Feminine
La Fleche Wallonne Feminine
Flèche Wallonne (women's race)